A pulpit is a raised stand for preachers in a Christian church.

Pulpit may also refer to:

Places
 Pulpit Lake, Custer County, Idaho, United States
 Pulpit Mountain, Coronation Island, South Orkney Islands
 The Pulpit (Washington), a mountain in USA
 Pulpit Peak, a mountain in Canada
 Pulpit Rock (disambiguation)

Horses and people
 Martin Pulpit (born 1967), Czech footballer and manager
 Pulpit (horse) (1994–2012), American Thoroughbred stallion, winner of Blue Grass Stakes
 Lucky Pulpit (foaled 2001), American Thoroughbred stallion, son of Pulpit

See also
 Pulpit Law, 1871 German anti-clerical law
 Pol Pot (1925–1998), Cambodian dictator